Aleksandr Fyodorovich Borisov (1 May 1905 – 12 May 1982) was a Soviet actor, film director, screenwriter and singer.

Borisov was a member of the Supreme Soviet of the USSR in 1962–1966. He won four Stalin Prizes (in 1947 for his theatrical 
work, in 1950 for Pavlov, and twice in 1951, for portraying Aleksandr Popov and Mussorgsky). People's Artist of the USSR (1951) and Hero of Socialist Labour (1981).

Borisov studied at the studio of the Alexandrinsky Theatre, he joined the troupe of its studio theater upon graduation in 1927 and its main 
troupe in 1928.

Aleksandr Borisov is best known for starring in biopic films; he appeared in the title roles of Grigori Roshal’s Ivan Pavlov (1949) and Mussorgsky (1950), as Rybkin in Herbert Rappaport’s Aleksandr Popov (1950), and as Alexander Herzen in Grigorii Kozintsev’s ill-fated Belinsky (1953).

Beginning with the Khrushchev Thaw, Borisov started to play more different roles, including, Professor Lapin in Mikhail Kalatozov’s comedy True Friends (1954) and as Marko Mukha in the blockbuster Maksim Perepelitsa (1956). The actor also appeared in adaptations of classical Russian literature such as Sergei Bondarchuk’s War and Peace (1962–1967), in which he portrayed Uncle Rostov, and Iosif Kheifits’s In S. City (1967) from Anton Chekhov’s story Ionych. In 1960, he directed an adaptation of Fedor Dostoevsky’s short story A Gentle Creature with Iya Savvina in the title role.

Selected filmography

Actor
 Friends (1938) as Nazarka
 Ivan Pavlov (1949) as Ivan Pavlov
 Alexander Popov (1949) as Rybkin
 Mussorgsky (1950) as Modest Petrovich Moussorgsky
 Belinsky (1953) as Alexander Herzen
 Rimsky-Korsakov (1953) as Savva Mamontov
 True Friends (1954) as Aleksandr Lapin
 Maksim Perepelitsa (1956) as Marko Mukha
 Volnitsa (1956) as Blyakhin
 War and Peace (1966, part 1, 2) as Uncle Rostov
 In S. City (1967) as Puzyryov
 Karpukhin (1973) as Judge Sarychev
Director
 A Gentle Creature  (1960)

References

External links
 

1905 births
1982 deaths
Male actors from Saint Petersburg
People from Sankt-Peterburgsky Uyezd
Sixth convocation members of the Supreme Soviet of the Soviet Union
Soviet film directors
Soviet male film actors
Soviet male singers
Soviet male stage actors
Soviet screenwriters
People's Artists of the USSR
People's Artists of the RSFSR
Heroes of Socialist Labour
Recipients of the Order of Lenin
Recipients of the Order of the Red Banner of Labour